Italy competed at the 2015 World Aquatics Championships in Kazan, Russia from 24 July to 9 August 2015. It won at least one medal in all disciplines except high diving.

Medalists

Diving

Italian divers qualified for the individual spots and the synchronized teams at the World Championships.

Men

Women

Mixed

High diving

Italy has qualified one high diver at the World Championships.

Open water swimming

Italy has nominated eleven swimmers to compete in the open water marathon.

Men

Women

Mixed

Swimming

Italian swimmers have achieved qualifying standards in the following events (up to a maximum of 2 swimmers in each event at the A-standard entry time, and 1 at the B-standard): Swimmers must qualify at the 2015 Italian Spring Championships and Sette Colli Trophy (for pool events) to confirm their places for the Worlds.

Thirty-seven swimmers (19 men and 18 women) have been nominated to the Italian team at the Worlds, including 2008 Olympic champion and world record holder Federica Pellegrini and 2013 Worlds bronze medalist Gregorio Paltrinieri in the men's 1500 m freestyle.

Men

Women

Mixed

Synchronized swimming

Italy fielded a full team of fourteen synchronized swimmers (one man and thirteen women) to compete in each of the following events.

Women

Mixed

Water polo

Men's tournament

Team roster

Stefano Tempesti
Francesco Di Fulvio
Alessandro Velotto
Pietro Figlioli
Alex Giorgetti
Andrea Fondelli
Massimo Giacoppo
Nicholas Presciutti
Niccolò Gitto
Stefano Luongo
Matteo Aicardi
Fabio Baraldi
Marco Del Lungo

Group play

Playoffs

Quarterfinals

Semifinals

Third place game

Women's tournament

Team roster

Giulia Gorlero
Chiara Tabani
Arianna Garibotti
Elisa Queirolo
Federica Radicchi
Rosaria Aiello
Tania Di Mario
Roberta Bianconi
Giulia Emmolo
Francesca Pomeri
Laura Barzon
Teresa Frassinetti
Laura Teani

Group play

Quarterfinals

Semifinals

Third place game

References

External links
Federazione Italiana Nuoto 

Nations at the 2015 World Aquatics Championships
2015 in Italian sport
Italy at the World Aquatics Championships